The Northwest Georgia Threatened Historic Sites project was established in 2005 as part of Kennesaw State University's Public History Program.  The project was developed to promote historic preservation by identifying, documenting, and publicizing threatened sites of historical significance in northwest Georgia.  The first initiative of the group, undertaken in the Fall of 2005 was to create a catalog listing of such sites and to call greater attention to the issue of preservation and to save some of these valuable historic sites.  The initial sites identified in Fall 2005 as being most "at-risk" have been posted at their web site and the project continues to solicit nominations for the 2006 catalog listing.

Catalog
Historic sites listed in the 2005 Catalog included the following:

Concord Baptist Church Cemetery - Established in 1832, the Concord Baptist Church Cemetery is one of the oldest in Cobb County.
DeSoto Theater - The first venue in the South to be designed and built for sound pictures is now threatened by a deteriorating roof and electrical system.
Gilmer County Courthouse - The Gilmer County Courthouse is on the National Register of Historic Places, and was demolished in January 2008.
Glover Tannery Ruins - The ruins of the 1845 Glover Tannery are threatened by neglect and road expansion.
Hyde Farm - In the 1830s, James Cooper Power and Rosa Dodd Power built a log home near the Chattahoochee River in Cobb County, GA, on what had recently been Cherokee Indian territory.
Kennesaw School - The 1938 Kennesaw School (the second school built on the site) is threatened by commercial development.
Manning-Smith House UPDATED!- This Greek revival home has been associated with several persons and events throughout its history.
Masonic Lodge #221 - One of only two Masonic Lodges listed on the Georgia Register of Historic Places and currently seeking a place on the National Register of Historic Places.
Nesbitt-Union Chapel Ruins - Ownership of the Nesbitt-Union Chapel property was resolved in Cobb Superior Court, when the Cobb County Commissioners were named trustees of the property. The remaining ruins are slated for ghost framing and the site, which is now managed by Cobb County Parks and Recreation, may eventually become a pocket park along the Powder Springs corridor.
Noonday Extension Cemetery - This Marietta cemetery dates to the 1830s and is in need of community support.
Stanley Road Community Cemetery - Needs support of area to keep it clean and weeded. Has grave of Civil War Col. and many Stanley Family and friends.
Smith Motel - This Cobb County motel is up for sale and threatened by commercial development.
Tate Depot - The 1916 Tate railroad depot is threatened by neglect.
Van Wert Methodist Church - This mid-19th century Rockmart church is currently vacant and in need of repair.
Old Powder Springs School - The 1920 school is slated to be razed to make room for a new library.
Old Villa Rica Library - The 1951 library is one of the oldest examples of the International Style in west Georgia. The library is threatened by demolition.
Sweetwater Creek State Park - The park's mill ruins are threatened by erosion.
Vinings Mountain - Pace Family Cemetery - This cemetery is threatened by vandalism and encroaching land development.
G.B. Williams Plantation - One of the largest pieces of undeveloped land left in Smyrna, this  historic site is threatened by encroaching development.
Woodstock, Georgia - The historic downtown of Woodstock is threatened by urban sprawl and encroaching development.

Two successes as a result of their efforts are the Manning-Smith House which is under contract with a developer that intends to save the property's historic structures, and the Taylor-Brawner House which will be restored beginning in early 2006.

References

External links

Landmarks in Georgia (U.S. state)
Kennesaw State University